HMS Santa Margarita was a 36-gun fifth-rate frigate of the Royal Navy. She had been built for service with the Spanish Navy, but was captured after five years in service, eventually spending nearly 60 years with the British.

Spanish career
Santa Margarita was built at Ferrol in 1774. In the action of 11 November 1779 Captain Alex Graeme of   brought her to battle off Lisbon and captured her. She was taken into Royal Navy service by an Admiralty Order of 16 March 1780; she was then repaired and refitted at Sheerness between February 1780 and June 1781.

British career

American Revolution
Santa Margarita was commissioned in March 1781 under Captain Elliot Salter, who sailed her to North America where she formed part of George Johnstone's squadron in June 1781. 

On 29 July 1782 she captured the 36-gun Amazone off Cape Henry, but the next day the squadron under Vaudreuil intervened, recapturing Amazone.

Two months later, on 30 September, Santa Margarita captured the American privateer Hendrick.

Santa Margarita was repaired at Bucklers Hard between 1790 and 1793, followed by a period fitting out at Portsmouth.

French Revolutionary Wars
Santa Margarita was recommissioned under Captain Eliab Harvey in 1793, and sailed to the Leeward Islands in December that year. She then formed part of the fleet in the West Indies under John Jervis, and was present at the capture of Martinique in February 1794.  By August 1794 she was in Sir John Borlase Warren's squadron, and was present at the destruction of Volontaire on the Penmarks on 23 August 1794, and the capture of Espion and the destruction of Alerte in Audierne Bay on that day.

On 29 March 1795 she was sailing with  when the two engaged and captured the 18-gun Jean Bart in the English Channel.

In April 1795 Santa Margarita came under the command of Captain Thomas Byam Martin.

In September 1795 a French squadron captured Hibberts, Chisolm, master, as she was sailing from Jamaica to London, but Santa Margarita recaptured her.

At the action of 8 June 1796 she captured the French Tamise, which had previously been . Santa Margarita had two killed and three wounded in the action. She went on to capture the 16-gun privateer Buonoparte on 24 October 1796, and the 18-gun privateer Vengeur the following day. Buonoparte was the former packet King George. Santa Margarita sent both into Cork. Vengeur was armed with 18 guns and had a crew of 110 men. She was nine days out of Brest when Santa Margarita captured her. Vengeur had captured the ship Potomah, which had been sailing from Poole to Newfoundland with a cargo of merchandise; the British recaptured Potomah.

Captain George Parker assumed command of Santa Margarita in December 1796. On 21 June 1797 she captured the privateer San Francisco (alias Los Amigos) off the Irish coast. San Francisco was pierced for 14 guns and had a crew of 53 men. She was from St Sebastian and had cruised between Scilly and Cape Clear for 20 days without having captured anything. She was apparently quite new and sailed well. Parker observed that with better luck she might have done some mischief.

Parker went on to have further success against privateers. He captured the 16-gun Adour off Cape Clear on 10 July 1797 and the 16-gun Victorine on 8 August in the same area.

Santa Margarita sailed to the Leeward Islands again in March 1798, and at the end of the year captured the 14-gun privateer Quatorze Juillet.

Lloyd's List (LL) reported on 28 May 1799 that the West Indiaman , Watkins, master, had been captured. However, Santa Margarita had recaptured her and sent her into Martinico.

Santa Margarita sailed to Jamaica in August 1801, coming under the command of Captain Augustus Leveson-Gower in April 1802, followed by Captain Henry Whitby in 1803.

Napoleonic Wars
Santa Margarita was on the Irish station in 1804, followed by a period in the Channel between 1804 and 1807 under Captain Wilson Rathbone. She was re-coppered at Plymouth in 1805 and again in 1806, and laid up in ordinary there between 1812 and 1813.

Fate
She was fitted as a lazarette in April 1814 and moved to Pembroke. She became a quarantine ship at Milford between 1814 and 1825, and was fitted out between 1824 and 1826 to allow her to be sailed to Liverpool. She was probably sold there on 8 September 1836 for the sum of £1,710.

Citations

References

External links
 
 

Ships built in Spain
1774 ships
Fifth-rate frigates of the Royal Navy